AMEC may refer to:
Amec Foster Wheeler, a global consultancy, engineering and project management company headquartered in London, United Kingdom
International Association for Measurement and Evaluation of Communication, the trade association for media evaluation companies
Association of Mining & Exploration Companies, the trade association for companies mining in Australia
African Methodist Episcopal Church, a predominantly African-American Methodist denomination based in the United States
Advanced Micro-Fabrication Equipment Inc., an Asia-based manufacturer of microfabrication equipment for the semiconductor and adjacent industries.
Arctic Military Environmental Cooperation, a joint Norwegian, Russian, and American government consortium (later joined by the British) to deal with military environmental issues, mainly the decommissioning of Russian nuclear-powered vessels
Afro-Middle East Centre, a Johannesburg-based think tank with a Middle East focus